2017 World Championship may refer to:

 2017 Men's Bandy World Championship
 2017 UCI Road World Championships
 2017 UCI Track Cycling World Championships
 2017 World Aquatics Championships
 2017 Artistic Gymnastics World Championships
 2017 World Championships in Athletics
 2017 World Men's Handball Championship
 2017 World Women's Handball Championship

Motorsports 

 2017 FIA Formula One World Championship
 2017 FIA World Endurance Championship
 2017 FIA World Rally Championship
 2017 FIA World Rallycross Championship
 2017 FIA World Touring Car Championship

Winter sports 

 2017 Biathlon World Championship
 2017 FIS Alpine World Ski Championships
 2017 FIS Nordic World Ski Championships
 2017 FIS Freestyle World Ski Championships
 2017 Men's World Ice Hockey Championships
 2017 Women's Ice Hockey World Championships
 2017 World Figure Skating Championships

See also
 2017 World Cup (disambiguation)